Daniel Munday (born 7 March 1985) is an Australian former basketball player.

Early life
Munday was born in Karratha, Western Australia. He graduated from Willetton Senior High School in Perth in 2002.

Basketball career
Munday played for the Mandurah Magic in the State Basketball League (SBL) in 2001 and 2002. He also played for the Magic in 2004 and 2005.

Munday played four seasons of college basketball in the United States. He spent one season in Wisconsin at the University of Green Bay before transferring to Ouachita Baptist University in Arkansas, where he spent three years with the Tigers between 2005 and 2008.

For the 2009 New Zealand NBL season, Munday joined the Harbour Heat, where he started every match and averaged just under eight points a game. For the 2010 New Zealand NBL season, he played in the inaugural Southland Sharks team.

In 2016 and 2017, Munday once again played for the Mandurah Magic.

Personal life
Munday the son of Greg and Sheryl Munday. His mother is from New Zealand. His partner Emily is from the United States.

References

External links
Southland Sharks profile

1985 births
Living people
Australian men's basketball players
Australian expatriate basketball people in the United States
Green Bay Phoenix men's basketball players
Guards (basketball)
Harbour Heat players
Ouachita Baptist Tigers men's basketball players
People from Karratha, Western Australia
Southland Sharks players